Lithuania competed at the 2008 Summer Paralympics in Beijing, China.

Medalists

Sports

Athletics

Men's track

Men's field

Women's field

Goalball

The men's team won the silver medal after losing in the gold medal match against China.

Players
Arvydas Juchna
Saulius Leonavicius
Nerijus Montvydas
Genrik Pavliukianec
Zydrunas Simkus
Marius Zibolis

Tournament

Quarterfinals

Semifinals

Gold medal match

Judo

Swimming

Men

Volleyball

Women's tournament
The women's volleyball team didn't win any medals; they were 6th out of 8 teams.
Players
Malda Baumgarde
Liudmila Budiniene
Ruta Cvirkiene
Virginija Dmitrijeva
Rita Latauskaite
Karolina Lingyte
Neringa Susinskyte
Jolita Urbutiene
Jurate Verbuviene
Virginija Ziltye

Group B Matches

5-8th Semifinals

5th-6th Classification match

See also
Lithuania at the Paralympics
Lithuania at the 2008 Summer Olympics

External links
Beijing 2008 Paralympic Games Official Site
International Paralympic Committee

References

Nations at the 2008 Summer Paralympics
2008
Paralympics